The discography of American rapper and record producer Jay Electronica consists of two studio albums, two compilation albums, one extended play (EP), three mixtapes, six singles and eighteen guest appearances. His breakout project, Act I: Eternal Sunshine (The Pledge), was released on July 2, 2007. His first single to chart was as a featured artist on fellow American rappers Big Sean and Kendrick Lamar's song "Control". It charted outside the US Billboard Hot 100 chart, reaching number 11 on the Bubbling Under Hot 100. Electronica made his first appearance on the Hot 100 with the song "Jesus Lord" from Kanye West's album Donda in 2021.

Studio albums

Compilation albums

EPs

Mixtapes

Singles

As lead artist

As featured artist

Other charted songs

Guest appearances

Production discography

2007

Jay Electronica – Act I: The Eternal Sunshine (The Pledge) 
 1. "Foreword" (featuring Erykah Badu and Just Blaze)
 2. "Eternal Sunshine of the Spotless Mind"
 3. "...Because He Broke the Rules"
 4. "Voodoo Man"
 5. "FYI"

2008

Nas – Untitled Nas album
 1. "Queens Get the Money"
Sample credit: John Powell – "I Am Sam (Theme)"

Jay Electronica – Scratches & Demos Vol.1
 1. "Annakin's Prayer"

2013

Self Scientific – Have Mercy
00. "Mercy" (featuring Kobe) (produced with DJ Khalil)

Notes

References

Hip hop discographies
Discographies of American artists
Production discographies